Kelly High School may refer to:

Monsignor Kelly Catholic High School (Beaumont, TX)
Thomas Kelly High School (Chicago, IL)
Kelly High School (Missouri) (Benton, MO)